Water Witch is a science fiction novel by authors Connie Willis and Cynthia Felice that was first published in 1982.

Plot introduction 
On the desert planet of Mahali, political power is held by a hereditary line of water witches who can sense and control water. A young con artist girl named Deza tries to impersonate a water witch, helped by the spirit of her recently dead conman father, who now resides in a small animal called a mbuzi.

Characters in Water Witch 

 Radi
 Deza
 Edvar
 Princess Sheria

Publication history 
1982, USA, Ace Books , Pub Date Jan 1982, Paperback
1999, USA GK Hall & Company , April 1999, Large Print Hardcover

1982 American novels
1982 science fiction novels
American science fiction novels
Ace Books books